The 2011 Los Angeles Blues season is the inaugural season of the club. For the 2011 season, the Blues will be playing in the USL Pro, the third tier of the United States soccer pyramid. This season marks the first time in the modern era of American soccer that three professional soccer clubs play in the Greater Los Angeles metropolitan area.

Review and events

Match results
Lists of matches, featuring result, attendance (where available) and scorers, grouped by competition (league, cup, other competition). Do not include friendly matches.

Legend

USL Pro

U.S. Open Cup

League standings

National Division

Club

Roster 
as of May 22, 2011

Note: (*) indicates a player on loan to the PDL Los Angeles Blues 23 side

Management and staff 
  Charlie Naimo - Head Coach
  Shayon Jalayer - Assistant Coach
  Agustin Rodriguez - Assistant Coach
  Salvador Moran - Assistant Coach
  Ahmad Reza Abedzadeh - Goalkeeper Coach
  Alyse LaHue - General Manager
  Alli D'Amico - Director of Operations

Statistics 

List of squad players, including number of appearances by competition

|}

Transfers

In

Out

Loan

In

Out

References 

Los Angeles Blues
American soccer clubs 2011 season
Los Angeles Blues